St. Joseph's Academy (SJA) is an all-girls Catholic school established in 1868 by the Sisters of St. Joseph of Medaille. St. Joseph's Academy (SJA) is the oldest high school in Baton Rouge.  It is the sister school of the all-boys Catholic High School, only three-tenths of a mile to the north.  It is located on a live oak shaded campus in Mid-City Baton Rouge, Louisiana, within the Roman Catholic Diocese of Baton Rouge.

History
SJA has been recognized four times as a Blue Ribbon School of Excellence by the U.S. Department of Education. In 2002, the Academy was recognized as a school of technology excellence by the U.S. Department of Education, one of only three in the nation.

The Broussard Street campus is the third for the school.  The original orphanage and school were located on what is now Seventh Street, and the school moved to its second campus on what is now Fourth and Florida Streets.  In 1941, the campus relocated to Broussard Street, its current location.

Athletics
SJA competes in the highest classification (Class 5A) in the Louisiana High School Athletic Association. The team is known as the Redstickers in a nod to its host city, Baton Rouge.

Championships
The Academy has been very successful in volleyball (winning ten state titles, including four in a row from 2001–04), swimming (winning state titles in 2018, 2017, 2016, 2015, 2014, 2013, 2012, 2011, 2005, 2003, 2002, 1996 and 1994), and cross country (winning stat titles in 2018, 2017, 2016, 2014, 2010, 2008, 1994, 1993, 1992 and 1985). 

SJA has successfully competed on the national level in competitive cheerleading as well, winning the Super Varsity National Champions title in 2018, 2021, and 2022. The school's colors are red and white, with navy blue used as an accent color.

References

External links 
 School website
 Article on Student-Run Help Desk
 Fujitsu Case Study
 Article on Fujitsu Tablets at SJA
 Laptop Institute Spotlight School

Schools in Baton Rouge, Louisiana
Catholic secondary schools in Louisiana
Educational institutions established in 1868
Girls' schools in Louisiana
1868 establishments in Louisiana